Fisher Bay is an embayment about wide between the eastern side of the Mertz Glacier Tongue and the mainland of Antarctica. It was discovered by the Australasian Antarctic Expedition (1911–14) under Douglas Mawson, who named it for Andrew Fisher, Prime Minister of Australia in 1911.

References 

Bays of George V Land